There are a number of languages used in Ireland. Since the late eighteenth century, English has been the predominant first language, displacing Irish. A large minority claims some ability to use Irish, and it is the first language for a small percentage of the population.

In the Republic of Ireland, under the Constitution of Ireland, both languages have official status, with Irish being the national and first official language. In Northern Ireland, English is the primary language for 95% of the population, and de facto official language, while Irish is recognised as an official language under the Identity and Language Act of 2022 and Ulster Scots is recognised as a minority language.

Languages

Prehistoric languages 
The earliest linguistic records in Ireland are of Primitive Irish, from about the 17th century BCE. Languages spoken in Iron Age Ireland before then are now irretrievable, although there are some claims of traces in Irish toponymy.

Modern languages

English 

Middle English was first introduced by the Cambro-Norman settlers in the 12th century. It did not initially take hold as a widely spoken language, as the Norman élite spoke Anglo-Norman. In time, many Norman settlers intermarried and assimilated to the Irish cultures and some even became "more Irish than the Irish themselves". Following the Tudor conquest of Ireland and the 1610–15 Ulster Plantation, particularly in the old Pale, Elizabethan English became the language of court, justice, administration, business, trade and of the landed gentry. Monolingual Irish speakers were generally of the poorer and less educated classes with no land. Irish was accepted as a vernacular language, but then as now, fluency in English was an essential element for those who wanted social mobility and personal advancement. After the legislative Union of Great Britain and Ireland's succession of Irish Education Acts that sponsored the Irish national schools and provided free public primary education, Hiberno-English replaced the Irish language. Since the 1850s, English medium education was promoted by both the UK administration and the Roman Catholic Church. This greatly assisted the waves of immigrants forced to seek new lives in the US and throughout the Empire after the Famine. Since then the various local Hiberno-English dialects comprise the vernacular language throughout the island.

The 2002 census found that 103,000 British citizens were living in the Republic of Ireland, along with 11,300 from the US and 8,900 from Nigeria, all of whom would speak other dialects of English. The 2006 census listed 165,000 people from the UK, and 22,000 from the US. The 2016 census reported a decline in UK nationals to the 2002 level: 103,113.

Irish 

The original Primitive Irish was introduced by Celtic speakers. Primitive Irish gradually evolved into Old Irish, spoken between the 5th and the 10th centuries, and then into Middle Irish. Middle Irish was spoken in Ireland, Scotland, and the Isle of Man through the 12th century, when it began to evolve into modern Irish in Ireland, Scottish Gaelic in Scotland, and the Manx language in the Isle of Man. Today, Irish is recognized as the first official language of the Republic of Ireland and is officially recognized in the European Union. Communities that speak Irish as their first language, generally in sporadic regions on the island's west coast, are collectively called the Gaeltacht.

In the 2016 Irish census, 8,068 census forms were completed in Irish, and just under 74,000 of the total (1.7%) said they spoke it daily. The total number of people who answered 'yes' to being able to speak Irish to some extent in April 2016 was 1,761,420, 39.8 percent of respondents.

 
Although the use of Irish in educational and broadcasting contexts has increased notably with the 600 plus Irish-language primary/secondary schools and creches , English is still overwhelmingly dominant in almost all social, economic, and cultural contexts. In the media, there is an Irish-language TV station TG4, Cúla 4 a children's channel on satellite, 5 radio stations such as the national station RTÉ Raidió na Gaeltachta, Raidió na Life in Dublin, as well as Raidió Fáilte in Belfast and a youth radio station Raidió Rí-Rá. There are also several newspapers, such as Tuairisc.ie, Meon Eile, Seachtain (a weekly supplement in the Irish Independent), and several magazines including Comhar, Feasta, and An Timire. There are also occasional columns written in Irish in English-language newspapers, including The Irish Times, The Irish News, The Irish Examiner, Metro Éireann, Irish Echo, the Evening Echo, and the Andersonstown News. All of the 40 or so radio stations in the Republic have to have some weekly Irish-language programming to obtain their broadcasting license. Similarly, RTÉ runs Nuacht, a news show, in Irish and Léargas, a documentary show, in Irish with English subtitles. The Official Languages Act 2003 gave many new rights to Irish citizens concerning the Irish language, including the use of Irish in court proceedings. All Dáil debates are to be recorded in Irish also. In 2007, Irish became the 21st official language of the European Union.

Ulster Scots 

Ulster Scots, sometimes called Ullans, is a dialect of Scots spoken in some parts of County Donegal and Northern Ireland. It is promoted and supported by the Ulster Scots Agency, a cross-border body. Its status as an independent language as opposed to a dialect of Scots has been debated.

Shelta 

Shelta is a cant, based upon both Irish and English, generally spoken by the Irish Traveller community. It is known as Gammon to Irish speakers and Shelta by the linguistic community. It is a mixture of English and Irish, with Irish being the lexifier language.

Shelta is a secret language, with a refusal by the Travellers to share with non-travellers, named "Buffers". When speaking Shelta in front of Buffers, Travellers will disguise the structure so as to make it seem like they aren't speaking Shelta at all. There is fear that if outsiders know the entirety of the language, it will be used to bring further discrimination to the Traveller community.

Sign languages 

Irish Sign Language (ISL) is the sign language of most of Ireland. It has little relation to either spoken Irish or English, and is more closely related to French Sign Language (LSF).

Northern Ireland Sign Language is used in Northern Ireland, and is related to both ISL and BSL in various ways. ISL is also used in Northern Ireland.

Immigrant languages

With increased immigration into Ireland, there has been a substantial increase in the number of people speaking languages. The table below gives figures from the 2016 census of population usually resident and present in the state who speak a language other than English, Irish or a sign language at home.

Extinct languages 
None of these languages were spoken by a majority of the population, but are of historical interest, giving loan words to Irish and Hiberno-English.

Latin 
Late Latin was introduced by the early Christians by c. 500. It remained a church language, but also was the official written language before and after the Norman conquest in 1171. Ecclesiastical Latin was used by the Roman Catholic church for services until the Vatican II reforms in 1962–65. Latin is still used in a small number of churches in Dublin, Cork, Limerick and Stamullen.

Norman language 
Norman settlers (especially their élite) introduced the Norman or Anglo-Norman language during the Norman invasion of Ireland of 1169. From Norman derived "Law French", a few words of which continue to be used today for certain legal purposes in both jurisdictions on the island.

Yola 

Yola was a language which evolved from Middle English, surviving in County Wexford up to the 19th century.

Fingalian 

Fingalian was similar to Yola but spoken in Fingal up until the mid-19th century.

Hiberno-Yiddish 

Hiberno-Yiddish was spoken by Irish Jews until recently, when most switched to English. It was based on Lithuanian Yiddish.

Language education

Republic of Ireland 
In primary schools, most pupils are taught to speak, read and write in Irish and English. The vast majority of schools teach through English, although a growing number of gaelscoil teach through Irish. Most students at second level choose to study English as an L1 language and Irish and other Continental European languages as L2 languages. Irish is not offered as an L1 language by the Department of Education. Prof. David Little (November 2003) said that there was an urgent need to introduce an L1 Irish Gaelic Curriculum. He quoted from a report by An Bord Curaclaim agus Scrúduithe (The Curriculum and Examinations Board) Report of the Board of Studies for Languages, Dublin 1987: "It must be stressed … that the needs of Irish as L1 at post-primary level have been totally ignored, as at present there is no recognition in terms of curriculum and syllabus of any linguistic differences between learners of Irish as L1 and L2.". The Continental European languages available for the Junior Certificate and the Leaving Certificate include French, German, Italian and Spanish; Leaving Certificate students can also study Arabic, Japanese and Russian. Some schools also offer Ancient Greek, Hebrew Studies and Latin at second level.

Students who did not immigrate to Ireland before the age of ten may receive an exemption from learning Irish. Pupils with learning difficulties can also seek exemption. A recent study has revealed that over half of those pupils who got exemption from studying Irish went on to study a Continental European language.
The following is a list of foreign languages taken at Leaving Certificate level in 2007, followed by the number as a percentage of all students taking Mathematics for comparison (mathematics is a mandatory subject).

Northern Ireland

The predominant language in the education system in Northern Ireland is English, with Irish Medium schools teaching exclusively in the Irish language. The ULTACH Trust coordinates the promotion of Irish in English Medium schools. In the GCSE and A Level qualification, Irish is the 3rd most chosen modern language in Northern Ireland, and in the top ten in the UK. Intakes in GCSE Irish and A Level Irish are increasing, and the usage of the language is also increasing.

References

External links 
Census 2011-Irish language frequency (p6)

 
Irish culture